Rush Enterprises, headquartered in New Braunfels, Texas, is an international retailer of commercial vehicles, primarily new and used trucks, through its  Rush Truck Centers. In 2019, the company operated over 200 Rush Truck Centers in 20 states as well as 14 locations in Canada. As of 2020, it was a Fortune 500 corporation.

Rush Truck Centers operates the largest network of commercial vehicle dealerships in the United States, with more than 200 locations in 22 states; as of 2019 the company became international after opening 14 locations in Canada. They represent truck and bus manufacturers, including Peterbilt, International, Hino, Isuzu, Ford, IC Bus and Blue Bird.

History 
The company was founded in 1965 by W. Marvin Rush, who remained chairman of the board until 2013, when he was succeeded by his son W.M. "Rusty" Rush. The company began as a dealership for Peterbilt trucks, but expanded greatly in the intervening years through acquisition of dealerships.

Major acquisitions include:

 Heavy truck business from Asbury Automotive Group in 2010.

Acquisitions

References 

Vehicle retailers
Companies based in New Braunfels, Texas
American companies established in 1965
Retail companies established in 1965